The 2021 season was Melaka United Football Club's 97th season in club history and 5th season in the Malaysia Super League.

Kits
 Supplier: al-Ikhsan
 Main sponsors: RedOne
 Other sponsors: Restoran Melayu, Hatten Groups

Management team

Players

Transfers

Transfers in
Pre-season

Mid-season

Transfers out
Pre-season

Mid-season

Extension of contract

Friendlies

Pre-season

JDT Invitation Cup (19-25 February 2021)

Others

Mid-season

Competitions

Malaysia Super League

Fixtures and results

League table

Malaysia Cup

Group stage

The draw for the group stage was held on 15 September 2021.

Knockout stage

Quarter-finals

Semi-finals

Statistics

Appearances and goals
Players with no appearances not included in the list.

Notes

References 

Melaka United F.C.
Melaka United F.C. seasons
Melaka United
Malaysian football club seasons by club